The Front Line is a 2006 Irish crime drama film directed by David Gleeson. The plot revolves around a Congolese immigrant working in a bank in Dublin city whose family is kidnapped by a gang of criminals who force him to be the inside man on their robbery of the bank.

Cast
 Eriq Ebouaney : Joe Yumba

External links

2006 films
Irish crime drama films
Films set in Dublin (city)
English-language Irish films
2006 crime drama films
2000s English-language films